The montane guinea pig (Cavia tschudii) is a species of caviid rodent found in the Andes in South America. The montane guinea pig is the likely main ancestor of Cavia porcellus, the domestic cavy or domestic guinea pig, which appears to be a hybrid that includes lesser genetic contributions from other Cavia species.

Taxonomy
Peruvian wild guinea pigs were first described by E. T. Bennett in 1835, who termed them Cavia cutleri. J. J. Tschudi, in an 1845 publication, used the term Cavia cutleri to refer to what are now considered two separate species: The first, Bennett's Cavia cutleri, which was later identified (by O. Thomas in 1917) as probably a differently-pigmented version of Cavia porcellus, and the second, a wild Peruvian guinea pig that was clearly different from the animal Bennett described. In 1867, L. Fitzinger renamed the clearly wild guinea pig Cavia tschudii.

Description
Their colour varies in different parts of the range; in Peru, the dorsal fur is dark reddish-brown mixed with black, and the underparts are dark buffy-grey; in Chile, the dorsal surface is pale agouti brown with paler underparts; in Bolivia, the upper parts are agouti olive and the underparts creamy-white or white.

Distribution and habitat
The montane guinea pig is native to the high Andes in South America. Its range extends from Peru southward to the Tarapacá Region of Chile and the Tucumán Province of Argentina. It lives in moist habitats with rocks and coarse vegetation, making runways through the foliage. In Argentina it lives in burrows with several entrances.

Lifecycle
The montane guinea pig has a gestation period around 63 days. Litter size ranges from one to four, and the young grow quickly, becoming independent at 2 months of age.

References

Cavies
Guinea pigs
Mammals of the Andes
Mammals of Argentina
Mammals of Bolivia
Mammals of Chile
Mammals of Peru
Mammals described in 1867
Rodents of South America
Taxa named by Leopold Fitzinger